Della Falls is a waterfall located within Strathcona Provincial Park on Vancouver Island in British Columbia, Canada.

Discovery
In 1899, prospector and trapper Joe Drinkwater discovered* Della Falls and named them after his wife.  Drinkwater also built a 16 km (10 mi) hiking trail to the falls via Drinkwater Creek. Evidence of his gold mining operation, including an aerial tramway he built, can still be seen near the falls.

Discovered in the European context. The falls were known of by First Nations Peoples long before Drinkwater walked there.

Access
The only way to reach Della Falls, other than by helicopter, is by crossing the entire Great Central Lake by boat; the only road access to the lake is at the opposite side from Strathcona Park. After the 35 km (21 mi) crossing, there is a dock that marks the beginning of Strathcona Park, and a camping area which can be used as a base camp before trying the next 15 km (9 mi) ascent to the base of Della Falls. More campsites are available along the trail and near the base of the falls. The hike, part of which follows an old logging railway, takes about seven hours one way and is suitable for intermediate level hikers.

See also
List of waterfalls of Canada

References

External links

 Trail Information
 Atlas of Canada's List of Tallest Waterfalls
 

Waterfalls of British Columbia
Landforms of Vancouver Island
Alberni Valley
Cascade waterfalls
Segmented waterfalls
Clayoquot Land District